The swimming competition at the 1999 Summer Universiade took place in Palma de Mallorca, Spain from July 4 to July 9, 1999.

Men's events

Women's events

References
 Results on HickokSports
 USA Swimming
 FISU

Swimming at the Summer Universiade
Uni
1999 Summer Universiade